General José Escolástico Marín (d. November 11, 1846) was born in San Vicente. He was acting president of El Salvador from 1 February to 12 April and from 19 July to 26 September 1842.

He was killed in action while fighting against the government of President Eugenio Aguilar.

External links
 Short biography

Year of birth missing
1846 deaths
People from San Vicente, El Salvador
Salvadoran people of Spanish descent
Presidents of El Salvador
19th-century Salvadoran people